Masudayama Yasuhito (舛田山 靖仁, born 10 April 1951 as Shigeru Masuda) is a former sumo wrestler from Nanao, Ishikawa, Japan. He made his professional debut in March 1974, and reached the top division in November 1976. His highest rank was sekiwake. He retired in July 1989 and became an elder in the Japan Sumo Association under the name Chiganoura. He was the oldest man in any of the professional sumo divisions at the time of his retirement. He set up Chiganoura stable (now renamed Tokiwayama stable) in 2004 at the age of 53, after he was passed over for the head coach position at Kasugano stable the previous year.  He retired upon reaching 65 years of age in April 2016, but was re-employed by his stable as a consultant, which expired upon his 70th birthday in April 2021. He continued to live at the old Chiganoura stable premises after it relocated earlier in 2021.

Career record

See also
Glossary of sumo terms
List of past sumo wrestlers
List of sumo elders
List of sumo tournament second division champions
List of sekiwake

References

1951 births
Living people
Japanese sumo wrestlers
Sumo people from Ishikawa Prefecture
Sekiwake
People from Nanao, Ishikawa